In navigational instruments, a plotter is an instrument which marks the position of a vehicle on a map or chart.

Types
Several types of plotters exist. These include manual and electronic plotters:

Manual plotters
 The parallel rulers plotter
 The triangle
 The Breton plotter

Semi-electronic plotters
 Yeoman plotter

See also
Course (navigation)

References

Navigational equipment
Tracking